Fleming Island is an unincorporated community and census-designated place (CDP) in Clay County, Florida, United States. As of the 2010 census the Fleming Island CDP had a population of 27,126. Fleming Island's ZIP code became 32003 in 2004, giving it a different code from Orange Park, the incorporated town to the north.

History
Fleming Island  was an area of Florida settled by Irish immigrant, George Fleming (1760-1821), who received a 1,000-acre land grant from the Spanish governor of East Florida for his military service. George Fleming built a plantation in 1790 and it was named Hibernia Plantation (in what is now Hibernia, Florida), after the Latin word for Ireland. When he died in 1821, the plantation was left to his son, Col. Lewis Michael Fleming (1798-1862).

In 1942, when the area was undeveloped, the U.S. Navy constructed four asphalt runways on the site and established a Naval Outlying Field designated as NOLF Fleming Island, an auxiliary airfield to Naval Air Station Jacksonville.  The Navy abandoned the auxiliary airfield in the 1960s, its runways too short to accommodate the jet aircraft then in operation at nearby NAS Jacksonville and NAS Cecil Field, and in the late 1990s the decaying runways were demolished to make way for current residential development.

Community 
Today, Fleming Island is primarily a bedroom community of nearby Jacksonville. Major developments include Eagle Harbor, Pace Island and Fleming Island Plantation. Fleming Island High School, which opened in 2003, is the only high school on the island.

Fleming Island ranks among the wealthiest zip codes in the Jacksonville area, placing #2 after Ponte Vedra Beach in the March 2013 Jacksonville Business Journal article. Fleming Island has its own  AMC Theatres, Walmart, Target, Home Depot, Kohl's, Publix, Winn-Dixie, Michael's, PetSmart and many other types of businesses. The Clay County Public Library headquarters is on Fleming Island, as are the Clay County Soccer Club fields.

Black Creek Park on the south end of the Fleming Island borders Black Creek and affords bikers and hikers nature trails. There is a park for children at Moccasin Slough on the north end of the island. Moccasin Slough also features a canal navigable by canoe or small boat, dug almost all the way to Doctors Lake. Fleming Island has relatively low crime and consistently scores high in livability.

Geography
The Fleming Island CDP is located in northeastern Clay County, sharing its northern border with the southern town limits of Orange Park. To the northwest is the CDP of Lakeside. To the northeast is a portion of the city of Jacksonville, and due east is Fruit Cove in St. Johns County on the other side of the St. Johns River.

Fleming Island is bordered by water or wetlands on all sides: the St. Johns River to the east, Doctors Lake to the north, Black Creek to the south and Swimming Pen Creek to the west. There are wetlands from Swimming Pen Creek to Black Creek that are not navigable. Some locals favor opening this to Black Creek but so far, the St. Johns Water Management District has not pursued the idea of doing this.

Demographics

As of the census of 2010, there were 27,126 people, 9,821 households, and 7,770 families residing in the CDP. There were 10,440 housing units, 9,821 of which were occupied. The racial makeup of the town was 86.2% White, 5.2% African American, 0.3% Native American, 4.1% Asian, 0.1% Pacific Islander, 1.4% some other race, and 2.7% from two or more races. Hispanic or Latino of any race were 6.4% of the population.

There were 9,821 households, out of which 41.3% had children under the age of 18 living with them, 66.5% were headed by married couples living together, 9.2% had a female householder with no husband present, and 20.9% were non-families. 17.2% of all households were made up of individuals, and 6.3% were someone living alone who was 65 years of age or older. The average household size was 2.76 and the average family size was 3.12.

In the CDP, the population was spread out, with 27.3% under the age of 18, 7.7% from 18 to 24, 23.0% from 25 to 44, 30.8% from 45 to 64, and 11.3% who were 65 years of age or older. The median age was 40.4 years. For every 100 females, there were 96.1 males. For every 100 females age 18 and over, there were 92.4 males.

For the period 2010–12, the estimated median annual income for a household in the CDP was $86,598, and the median income for a family was $96,755. Male full-time workers had a median income of $71,494 versus $47,864 for females. The per capita income for the CDP was $32,102.

Schools
The Clay County School District operates public schools. Fleming Island High School opened in 2003 and is the sole high school for the island and in the CDP. There are three elementary schools: Thunderbolt, Fleming Island, and Paterson.

References

External links
Fleming Island Online, community website

Unincorporated communities in Clay County, Florida
Census-designated places in the Jacksonville metropolitan area
Unincorporated communities in Florida
Census-designated places in Florida
Populated places on the St. Johns River